Surfactant therapy is the medical administration of exogenous surfactant.  Surfactants used in this manner are typically instilled directly into the trachea. When a baby comes out of the womb and the lungs are not developed yet, they require administration of surfactant in order to process oxygen and survive. This condition that the baby has is called newborn respiratory distress syndrome, and it is treatable. Surfactant coat the smallest parts of the lungs called the alveoli and helps for oxygen to go in and for carbon dioxide to go out. How surfactant does this is by not allowing the alveoli to collapse and to retain their inflated shape when the baby exhales.

In premature babies the type II pneumocytes, special lung cells that make surfactant, are not working yet. This means that the baby needs to get surfactant until that baby can make the surfactant on his own. In addition, the baby will need to be monitored and checked regularly as well as intubated or put on CPAP so that he can breathe. This means that until he is able to make surfactant and breathe on his own, he needs to be watched carefully by doctors and nurses.

Types of surfactants
Poractant alfa, Calfactant, and Beractant are types of natural surfactants commercially available in the United States.  Although data is sometimes conflicting, it appears that there are no significant differences among the available preparations.

LISA surfactant delivery in infants 
The LISA (Less Invasive Surfactant Administration) method is much more effective in situations where the preterm infant is already breathing, and it has become a standard procedure in German hospitals. Intubation via mechanical ventilation is less effective than the LISA method within the first 72 hours of birth.

Respiratory distress syndrome 
Exogenous surfactant replacement therapy is effective in reducing IRDS mortality and morbidity in preterm infants.

Adult respiratory distress syndrome 
Surfactant therapy is not used to treat adults with adult respiratory distress syndrome because the evidence regarding its effect on patient-important outcomes is inconsistent.

See also
 Respiratory care
 Nursing
 Neonatology
 Meconium aspiration syndrome

References

Respiratory therapy
Neonatology